The American Legion Memorial Bridge, also known as the South Cass Street Bridge, is a reinforced concrete arch bridge carrying South Cass Street over the Boardman River in Traverse City, Michigan.  It was completed in 1930 and listed on the National Register of Historic Places in 2000.

History
In 1929 the city commission called for a public referendum to decide if the city should build bridges over the Boardman River at South Union and South Cass Streets. The referendum passed, and at the same time the state agreed to build the Union Street Bridge. The city commission hired Indianapolis bridge engineer Daniel B. Luten to design the bridge at South Cass. The firms of Aldrich & Cook and Jerome Wilhelm were hired to build the bridge, which was completed in 1930.  Dedication plaques were purchased during construction at the request of the American Legion.

At some point, the original handrails were removed and jersey barricades were added, detracting somewhat from the original design.  However, the bridge is still in use. In 2021/22, the bridge underwent extensive renovation, including  a removal and replacement of the bridge and the installation of a decorative pedestrian railing.

Description
The span is formed by a barrel-vaulted elliptical arch. Sidewalks, supported by concrete brackets, overhang the face of the arch. The original balustrade railings on the bridge have been replaced with planks, but the approaches still contain the original solid-concrete parapets and concrete balustrades with urn-shaped spindles. A plate on one parapet reads: "American Legion Memorial Bridge 1930."

See also

References

External links
 
Information on the American Legion Memorial Bridge (Michigan Web Site)
South Cass Street Bridge from HistoricBridges.org: multiple photographs.

Bridges completed in 1930
Traverse City, Michigan
Road bridges on the National Register of Historic Places in Michigan
Monuments and memorials in Michigan
American Legion
Buildings and structures in Grand Traverse County, Michigan
Transportation in Grand Traverse County, Michigan
National Register of Historic Places in Grand Traverse County, Michigan
Concrete bridges in the United States
Arch bridges in the United States